Semecarpus paucinervius is a species of plant in the family Anacardiaceae. It is endemic to the Philippines.

References

Endemic flora of the Philippines
paucinervius
Vulnerable plants
Taxonomy articles created by Polbot